The 2016–17 Bahraini First Division League (also known as VIVA Bahrain League for sponsorship reasons), was the 60th top-level football season in Bahrain. Ten teams participated with Al-Hidd as the defending champions after securing the championship last season for the first time.

Malkiya won the title for the first time.

League table

References

Bahraini Premier League seasons
1
Bah